Mumra may refer to:

 Mumra, Nepal
 Mumra, Astrakhan Oblast, Russia
 Mumm-Ra (band), an English indie rock band originally from Bexhill-on-Sea
 Mumm-Ra the Ever-Living, a character in the Thundercats TV series